Jeshua (יֵשׁ֡וּעַ), a variant of Yehoshua, may refer to:
Yeshua or Jeshua, a Hebrew name mentioned in several places in the Jewish Tanakh
Joshua the High Priest at the time of Ezra

See also 
Jesus (disambiguation)
Jehoshua
Joshua (disambiguation)